Degranulation is a cellular process that releases antimicrobial cytotoxic or other molecules from secretory vesicles called granules found inside some cells.   It is used by several different cells involved in the immune system, including granulocytes (neutrophils, basophils, and eosinophils) and mast cells. It is also used by certain lymphocytes such as natural killer (NK) cells and cytotoxic T cells, whose main purpose is to destroy invading microorganisms.

Mast cells
Antigens interact with IgE molecules already bound to high affinity Fc receptors on the surface of mast cells to induce degranulation, via the activation of tyrosine kinases within the cell. The mast cell releases a mixture of compounds, including histamine, proteoglycans, serotonin, and serine proteases from its cytoplasmic granules.

Eosinophils
In a similar mechanism, activated eosinophils release preformed mediators such as major basic protein, and enzymes such as peroxidase, following interaction between their Fc receptors and IgE molecules that are bound to large parasites like helminths.

Neutrophils
Four kinds of granules exist in neutrophils that display differences in content and regulation. Secretory vesicles are the most likely to release their contents by degranulation, followed by gelatinase granules, specific granules, and azurophil granules.

Cytotoxic T cells and NK cells
Cytotoxic T cells and NK cells release  molecules like perforin and granzymes by
a process of directed exocytosis to kill infected target cells.

See also
 Basophil activation

References

External links
 

Immunology
Cell biology
Biological processes